The 1995 World's Strongest Man was the 18th edition of World's Strongest Man and was won by Magnus Ver Magnusson from Iceland, it was his second consecutive and third overall title. Gerrit Badenhorst from South Africa finished second after finishing fourth the previous year, and Marko Varalahti from Finland finished third. The contest was held in Nassau, Bahamas.

Heats

Group 1

Group 2

Group 3

Group 4

Group 5

Final results

References

External links
 Official site
 1995 results at Bill Henderson's Strongest Man site

World's Strongest
World's Strongest Man
1995 in Bahamian sport